Okely is a surname. Notable people with the surname include:

Demi Okely (born 1997), Australian rules footballer
Judith Okely (born 1941), British anthropologist
William Ignatius Okely, 19th-century English architect

See also
Okey (surname)